Changa Chet is a 2018 Nepalese romantic comedy-drama film directed by Dipendra K Khanal. The film is written by Pradip Bhardwaj and produced by Madhav Wagle and Sharmila Pandey. The film stars Ayushman Joshi, Rabindra Jha, Sandip Chhetri, Arpan Thapa, Priyanka Karki, Paramita Rana, Surakshya Panta in the lead roles. The prop currency used during the shooting of the movie lead to the prosecution of the movie producer Madhav Wagle, art director Sudip Tamang and an Assistant Mahendra Bogati.

The film was released on November 2, 2018 and met with positive response from critics and audience. The film was a commercial success at the box office.

Plot 
Three people meet who have different aspirations of their own. They face a lot of challenges after they borrow lot of money of a gangster but they lose the money.

Cast 

 Ayushman Joshi as Niraj / Siddhartha
 Rabindra Jha as Udit Narayan
 Arpan Thapa as Mukunda
 Sandip Chhetri as Thame
 Surakshya Panta as Manisha
 Paramita RL Rana

Soundtrack

References

External links 

 
 Changa Chet on IMPAWARDS

2018 films
2018 romantic comedy-drama films
Nepalese romantic comedy films
Films set in Nepal